Nina Hagen is the fourth solo (and sixth overall) studio album by German singer Nina Hagen. It was released on October 8, 1989, by Mercury Records.

Track listing

Notes
"Live on Mars" is sung in Sanskrit.
"Michail Michail" and "Ave Maria" are sung in German.

Personnel
Nina Hagen – vocals
Billy Liesegang – guitar; bass on "Dope Sucks"
Luís Jardim – drums, percussion; bass on "Love Heart Attack"
Zeus B. Held – keyboards
The Soultanas – background vocals
Lene Lovich – vocals on "Where's the Party"
Lemmy – vocals, distorted bass on "Where's the Party"
Kick Horns – brass on "Only Seventeen"
Mark Griffiths – bass, guitar on "Hold Me" and "Ave Maria"
Barry Fitzgerald – drums on "Super Freak Family" and "Dope Sucks"
Lawrence Cottle – bass on "Only Seventeen"
Alistair Gavin – piano on "Ave Maria"
Martin Ditcham – percussion on "Ave Maria"
The Bortobello Philharmonic, conducted by Richard Niles on "Ave Maria"
Jean-Paul Gaultier - art direction

References

1989 albums
Nina Hagen albums
Mercury Records albums